Strata Presents The End of the World is Strata's second full-length album and was released on July 17, 2007.

Track listing

References

2007 albums
Strata (band) albums